How to Grow a Planet is a 2012 television nature documentary series produced by the BBC on and originally broadcast on BBC Two. It is presented by Professor Iain Stewart and ran for three 60 minute episodes in February 2012. It covers the role of plants in shaping the planet, altering the atmosphere, the evolution of ecological relationships and their role in shaping human evolution.

Episodes

Merchandise
A single-disc DVD set of the series was released on 16 April 2012.

References

External links
 

2012 British television series debuts
2012 British television series endings
BBC television documentaries about science
BBC high definition shows
Nature educational television series
English-language television shows
British documentary television series